14 Days may refer to:
14 Days (EP)
14 Days (film)

See also
 Fortnight (disambiguation)
 Two weeks (disambiguation)